Critique  is a monthly literary, philosophical and artistic journal established in 1946 by Georges Bataille. Originally published by Editions du Chêne, it has been published since 1950 by Les Éditions de Minuit.

References

External links

Social philosophy journals
Publications established in 1946
French-language journals
Monthly journals